(born December 15, 1945 in Kyoto, Japan) is a retired Japanese jazz singer.

Biography
Kimiko was born in Kyoto, Japan in 1945. She first became interested in jazz at the age of 13 after hearing Chris Connor's song "All About Ronnie" on the radio. At age 16 she moved to Tokyo and started performing in jazz clubs. Her first recording was with Japanese pianist Yuzuru Sera in 1968

Kimiko's first album as a solo artist was entitled Just Friends in 1970. In the following year, Kimiko sang the advertising jingle of "Cup Noodles," a brand of the world's first instant cup noodle ramen. In June 1972, she signed on an exclusive contract with CBS/Sony, and recorded Satin Doll with support of Gil Evans during Evans' first visitation to Japan. 

Later she recorded many albums in collaboration with musicians in the jazz field, such as Teo Macero, Lee Konitz, Stan Getz, Paulinho Da Costa, Billy Higgins, Cedar Walton and Herbie Hancock.

In the 1980s, Kimiko stopped performing and later moved into the jewelry design business. 

Kimiko was married to drummer Hiroshi Murakami. In 1990 she married Richard Rudolph and currently resides in Santa Monica and Tokyo, Japan.

Discography
1968: The Modern Playing Mate (Union) –  Trio introducing Kimiko Kasai
1970: Just Friends (London) – Live
1971: Yellow Carcass in the Blue (TBM) – with Kosuke Mine Quartet
1971: One for Lady (Victor) – with Mal Waldron
1972: Umbrella (CBS/Sony) – works of Hiroshi Kamayatsu
1972: Satin Doll (CBS/Sony) – with Gil Evans Orchestra
1973: What’s New (CBS/Sony)
1974: In Person (CBS/Sony) – Featuring Oliver Nelson
1974: Thanks Dear (CBS/Sony) 
1974: Kimiko Is Here (CBS/Sony) – with Cedar Walton Trio
1975: This Is My Love (CBS/Sony) – produced by Teo Macero, with Lee Konitz and Stan Getz
1976: We Can Fall in Love (CBS/Sony) – produced by Teo Macero
1977: Tokyo Special (CBS/Sony)
1978: Round and Round (CBS/Sony)
1979: Butterfly (CBS/Sony) – with Herbie Hancock. Reissued (Be With Records, 2018).
1982: Kimiko (CBS/Sony)
1982: Love Connection (CBS/Sony)
1984: Love Talk (CBS/Sony)
1984: New Pastel (CBS/Sony)
1985: Watching You (CBS/Sony)
1986: My One and Only Love (CBS/Sony)
1987: Perigo a Noite (Eastworld)
1990: Kimiko Kasai (Kitty) – with Cedar Walton Trio

Filmography
 Hairpin Circus (1972) as Rie Mizukami

References

External links

1945 births
Japanese women jazz singers
Living people
Japanese jewellery designers
Musicians from Kyoto Prefecture
20th-century Japanese women singers
20th-century Japanese singers